An iodate is the polyatomic anion with the formula . It is the most common form of iodine in nature, as it comprises the major iodine-containing ores. Iodate salts are often colorless. They are the salts of iodic acid.

Structure
Iodate is pyramidal in structure.  The O–I–O angles range from 97° to 105°, somewhat smaller than the O–Cl–O angles in chlorate.

Reactions

Redox
Iodate is one of several oxyanions of iodine, and has an oxidation number of +5.  It participates in several redox reactions, such as the iodine clock reaction. Iodate show no tendency to disproportionate to periodate and iodide, in contrast to the situation for chlorate.

Iodate is reduced by sulfite:
6HSO3- +  2IO3- ->  2I- + 6HSO4-
Iodate oxidizes iodide:
5I- +  IO3- + 3H2SO4 -> 3I2 + 3H2O + 3SO4^2-
Similarly, chlorate oxidizes iodide to iodate:
I- + ClO3- -> Cl- + IO3-

Iodate is also obtained by reducing a periodate with a sulfide. The byproduct of the reaction is a sulfoxide.

Acid-base
Iodate is unusual in that it forms a strong hydrogen bond with its parent acid:
 IO3- + HIO3 -> H(IO3)2-
The anion  is referred to as biiodate.

Principal compounds
 Calcium iodate, Ca(IO3)2, is the principal ore of iodine.  It is also used as a nutritional supplement for cattle.
 Potassium iodate, KIO3, like potassium iodide, has been issued as a prophylaxis against radioiodine absorption in some countries.
 Potassium hydrogen iodate (or potassium biiodate), KH(IO3)2, is a double salt of potassium iodate and iodic acid and an acid as well.

Natural occurrence
Minerals containing iodate are found in the caliche deposits of Chile. The most important iodate minerals are lautarite and brüggenite, but also copper-bearing iodates such as salesite are known.

References

Halates